Kisanrao Bankhele was a member of the 9th Lok Sabha of India. He represented the Khed constituency of Maharashtra and was a member of the Janata Dal political party. Bankhele was a member of the Maharashtra Legislative Assembly from the Ambegaon in Pune district.

References

India MPs 1989–1991
Living people
Marathi politicians
Janata Dal politicians
Janata Party politicians
Lok Sabha members from Maharashtra
People from Pune district
Members of the Maharashtra Legislative Assembly
Year of birth missing (living people)
Bharatiya Janata Party politicians from Maharashtra